Juan Sebastián Cabal and Robert Farah were the two-time defending champions, but lost in the final to Andrés Molteni and Horacio Zeballos, 3–6, 7–5, [3–10].

Seeds

Draw

Draw

References
 Main draw

Argentina Open - Doubles
ATP Buenos Aires